Chen Yi-wei (born 27 March 1987) is a Taiwanese football player. He plays as a defender.

International career

International goals
Scores and results list Chinese Taipei's goal tally first.

Education 
 National Taiwan College of Physical Education

References

External links

 
  Chen Yi-wei's personal blog
 

1987 births
Living people
Taiwanese footballers
Footballers from Kaohsiung
Chinese Taipei international footballers
Association football defenders